The AtlantiCare Regional Medical Center Mainland Campus is a 323-bed hospital, opened in 1975, and located in the Pomona section of  Galloway Township, New Jersey, United States. Situated on the Stockton University campus, the Mainland Campus experienced a 44% growth in admissions from 1986 to 1992. The Mainland Campus completed a $16 million modernization or renovation project in early 1992.

History
What was once called Atlantic City Hospital in the late 19th century and early 20th century, and became Atlantic City Medical Center, and is now AtlantiCare Regional Medical Center has a history that is deeply tied to the roots of Atlantic City, New Jersey.

Early years
It wasn't until the late 1880s that community leaders took steps to provide basic medical care for Atlantic City residents and visitors. They designated a room in the old City Hall for medical emergencies and set up another building outside city limits to treat contagious diseases. This arrangement seemed to work for a while, especially since a private sanitarium—which could house additional patients—was built a few years later. However the sanitarium did not admit anyone with an infectious disease.

Then, in 1895 and 1896, two disastrous incidents occurred that made people think about the adequacy of medical care in Atlantic City. First, a building collapsed during a crowded Elks convention, injuring too many people to be cared for at City Hall. The following year, a major railroad accident resulted in 100 patients, all of whom had to be cared for at the sanitarium.

What would happen the next time there was an accident or health crisis? The proprietor of the sanitarium was considering ending his contract with the city. The time had come for Atlantic City to have a hospital.

Creation of hospital
At first it seemed that constructing a hospital in Atlantic City would be difficult. Only two people, John P. Rochford, founder of the sanitarium, and Alfred W. Heston, city comptroller, attended the initial meeting on February 17, 1897. Rochford and Heston immediately elected each other temporary president and secretary, respectively, and named a board of nine other members. After several meetings of the full board, the Atlantic City Hospital Association was incorporated on April 8, 1897.

Their first step was to find a location for the hospital. The Association chose a converted white house on Ohio Ave. and realized $16,000 to purchase it. The newly formed Ladies Auxiliary collected another $616 in donations, used for furnishings. The Association hired one full-time doctor, Alan Simpson, M.D., of Jefferson Medical College. They also obtained donations of sheets, reading material, canned goods and other necessities.

In November 1898, the Atlantic City Hospital officially opened its doors. Its first patient was 11-year-old Gussie Johan, who suffered a broken leg from a fall off of a carriage when a goat spooked his horse. The equipment was scant: a dozen chairs, a few tables, some hospital machines and a dilapidated horse-drawn ambulance.

See also
 List of hospitals in New Jersey

External links
AtlantiCare Regional Medical Center – Mainland Campus

Buildings and structures in Atlantic County, New Jersey
Galloway Township, New Jersey
Hospitals in New Jersey
Stockton University
Hospitals established in 1975
1975 establishments in New Jersey